The Speaker of the Maharashtra Legislative Assembly is the presiding officer of the Legislative Assembly of Maharashtra, the main law-making body for the Indian state of Maharashtra. The Speaker is elected in the very first meeting of the Maharashtra Legislative Assembly after the general elections for a term of 5 years from amongst the members of the assembly. The Speaker holds office until ceasing to be a member of the assembly or resignation from the office. The Speaker can be removed from office by a resolution passed in the assembly by an effective majority of its members. In the absence of Speaker, the meeting of Maharashtra Legislative Assembly is presided by the Deputy Speaker.

Eligibility
The Speaker of the Assembly:

 Must be a citizen  of India;
 Must not be less than 25 years of age; and
 Should not hold any office of profit under the Government of Maharashtra.

Powers and functions of the speaker
The speaker of the legislative assembly conducts the business in house, and decides whether a bill is a money bill or not.  They maintain discipline and decorum in the house and can punish a member for their unruly behaviour by suspending them. They also permit the moving of various kinds of motions and resolutions such as a motion of no confidence, motion of adjournment, motion of censure and calling attention notice as per the rules. The speaker decides on the agenda to be taken up for discussion during the meeting. The date of election of the speaker is fixed by the Governor of Maharashtra. Further, all comments and speeches made by members of the House are addressed to the speaker. The speaker is answerable to the house. Both the speaker and deputy speaker may be removed by a resolution passed by the majority of the members.

List of speakers

The Assembly is headed by a Speaker, elected by members in a simple majority vote. The following is the list of speakers of the Assembly.

See also
List of governors of Maharashtra
List of chief ministers of Maharashtra
 List of Deputy Speakers of the Maharashtra Legislative Assembly

References

Lists of legislative speakers in India
Speakers of the Maharashtra Legislative Assembly
Lists of people from Maharashtra
Maharashtra-related lists
Government of Maharashtra